Kevin William Lewis (born 25 September 1952) was an English footballer who played in the Football League for Crewe Alexandra and Stoke City. His nephew of the same name was also a footballer who played for Stoke City.

Career
Lewis was born in Hull and played in the youth teams of Manchester United before joining Stoke City in 1972. He never was really able to force his way into Tony Waddington's side and after 16 appearances in four seasons he left the Victoria Ground. He spent three years out of the game before joining Crewe Alexandra in 1979. He spent three seasons at Crewe making 132 appearances and spent a season at Telford United.

Career statistics
Source:

References

1952 births
Living people
Footballers from Kingston upon Hull
English footballers
Stoke City F.C. players
Crewe Alexandra F.C. players
English Football League players
Leek Town F.C. players
English football managers
Leek Town F.C. managers
Telford United F.C. players
Association football defenders